Place Vanier is an office building complex on North River Road in the Vanier section of Ottawa.  The Building has three towers, and the major tenant in two of them is the Canadian Federal Government.

Buildings
 Tower A: 333 North River Road
 Tower B: 355 North River Road

External links
Emporis Buildings: Place Vanier Tower A
Emporis Buildings: Place Vanier Tower B

Buildings and structures in Ottawa
Modernist architecture in Canada